Grant Connell and Patrick Galbraith were the defending champions but did not compete that year.

Marcos Ondruska and Jack Waite won the final on a walkover against Jonas Björkman and Brett Steven.

Seeds
Champion seeds are indicated in bold text while text in italics indicates the round in which those seeds were eliminated.

  Jonas Björkman /  Brett Steven (final, withdrew)
  Guy Forget /  Jakob Hlasek (quarterfinals)
  David Adams /  Richey Reneberg (quarterfinals)
  Jiří Novák /  David Rikl (quarterfinals)

Draw

References
 1996 BellSouth Open Doubles Draw

ATP Auckland Open
1996 ATP Tour